The 1986 LPGA Tour was the 37th season since the LPGA Tour officially began in 1950. The season ran from January 23 to November 9. The season consisted of 33 official money events. Pat Bradley won the most tournaments, five, including three of the four majors. She also led the money list with earnings of $492,021.

There were five first-time winners in 1986: Jane Geddes, Cindy Mackey, Becky Pearson, and Ai-Yu Tu. Tu was the first Taiwanese winner, winning the Mazda Japan Classic.

The tournament results and award winners are listed below.

Tournament results
The following table shows all the official money events for the 1986 season. "Date" is the ending date of the tournament. The numbers in parentheses after the winners' names are the number of wins they had on the tour up to and including that event. Majors are shown in bold.

* - non-member at time of win

Awards

References

External links
LPGA Tour official site
1986 season coverage at golfobserver.com

LPGA Tour seasons
LPGA Tour